Aranmanai Kaavalan is a 1994 Indian Tamil-language action drama film directed by Selva Vinayagam. The film stars R. Sarathkumar and Sivaranjani. It was released on 25 February 1994.

Plot 

Sakthi and his best-friend Thangamani are taxi-drivers in Mumbai. Sakthi fights for the Tamil community against the local rowdies who want to expel them from their area. The Tamil Association of Mumbai prepares the 25th-anniversary function, so the association's presidents invite the pillars of the association. Still, only one person doesn't respond for the invitation : Karpagavalli, the wife of the late founder Sandanapandian. The presidents go to Karpagavalli's village Pasumpon to invite her, but they are driven out from the village. In fact, Karpagavalli and her three relatives, one of who is Uma, are held prisoners by the heartless Duraipandi in his palace. Under pressure, Duraipandi finally lets Karpagavalli go to the function in Mumbai. In the meantime, the police officers force the Tamil community to leave their place, but they refuse. So the police officers kidnap and rape the young girls under the influence of the ruthless Amara Settu. Sakthi turns berserk, and he kills all the police officers and Amara Settu who created conflicts between the Tamil people and Hindi people. Therefore, Sakthi becomes a hero for the community, and they ask him to flee instead of surrendering. By chance, Sakthi and Thangamani take the same train as Karpagavalli. Karpagavalli asks them to come to her village, and she compels Sakthi to become the palace's protector. Later, Sakthi and Thangamani try to leave the village, but Karpagavalli stops them. In the process, Karpagavalli was heavily wounded by Duraipandi's henchmen.

In the past, Sandanapandian was the village chief and was a respected man. While his uncle (Mohan Natarajan), Duraipandi's father, was a womaniser and was hated by the villagers, his uncle was jealous of Sandanapandian. One day, he behaved badly with school girls, so Sandanapandian forced him to beg forgiveness from the girl at the village court. After this humiliation, Duraipandi's father committed suicide. Duraipandi killed all the men of Sandanapandian's family, including Sandanapandian. Later, Duraipandi's mother self-immolated. Since that day, Duraipandi sequesters Karpagavalli, Uma and her family.

After telling her poignant past, Karpagavalli dies on Sakthi's knees. So Sakthi challenges the villain Duraipandi to prepare Uma's wedding. Meanwhile, Uma falls in love with Sakthi. What transpires subsequent forms the rest of the story.

Cast 
R. Sarathkumar as Sakthi
Sivaranjani as Uma
Goundamani as Thangamani
Vijayakumar as Sandanapandian
Raghuvaran as Duraipandi
Srividya as Karpagavalli
K. Rajpreeth as Amara Settu
Veera Pandiyan as Duraipandi's son
Khushbu in a cameo appearance

Soundtrack 
The music was composed by Deva, with lyrics written by Vairamuthu.

Release and reception 
Aranmanai Kaavalan was released on 25 February 1994, alongside another Sarathkumar starrer Captain. Malini Mannath of The Indian Express gave the film a positive review and said "a fairly engrossing entertainer, despite flaws, Aranmanai Kaavalan has an engaging screenplay, neat treatment and suspense that keeps the viewers on tenterhooks". New Straits Times called the film "slightly better than other average Sarath movies". Thulasi of Kalki panned the story as predictable, humour being unfunny and dismissed Deva's music as repetitive and concluded the review saying Sarathkumar seemer to be working by calculating one film a month; it was fine if it did not go wrong and make producers run away.

References

External links 
 

1990s action drama films
1990s Tamil-language films
1994 films
Films scored by Deva (composer)
Films shot in Mumbai
Indian action drama films